Matt Steven Parcell (born 30 October 1992) is an Australian professional rugby league footballer who plays as a  for Hull Kingston Rovers in the Betfred Super League. 

He previously played for the Brisbane Broncos and Manly Warringah Sea Eagles in the NRL. Parcell has also played for the Leeds Rhinos in the Super League, and on loan from Leeds at Hull KR.

Background
Parcell was born in Ipswich, Queensland, Australia. He is the grandson of former Australian international Gary Parcell.

Parcell played his junior rugby league for the Fassifern Bombers, before being signed by the Ipswich Jets. He also attended Mutdapilly State School, and went to Ipswich Grammar School in his high school years.

Playing career

2015
In 2015, Parcell joined the Brisbane Broncos. In the preseason, he beat former Bronco Jake Granville's 2.5-kilometre cross country record twice in one hour and then set a new mark for the Broncos' 1.8-kilometre run, while he can also run 40 metres in under five seconds. On 3 May, he played for the Queensland Residents against the New South Wales Residents. In Round 12 of the 2015 NRL season, he made his NRL debut for the Broncos against the Canberra Raiders. On 18 August, he signed a 3-year contract with the Manly Warringah Sea Eagles starting in 2016.

2016
Parcell's first competitive showing with the Sea Eagles was during the first day of the 2016 NRL Auckland Nines at Eden Park in New Zealand. He crossed for the winning try for Manly in their opening game against the Broncos, and later replicated the feat by scoring the winning try in their second game against the New Zealand Warriors. In December, he signed a 3-year contract with Super League side Leeds Rhinos, after being released from the final two years of his Sea Eagles contract.

2017
He played in the 2017 Super League Grand Final victory over the Castleford Tigers at Old Trafford.

2019
On 26 June 2019, Parcell joined fellow Super League side Hull Kingston Rovers on a deal until the end of the season. Just 24 hours after signing for the Hull Kingston Rovers, Parcell scored the winning try on his debut against cross-city rivals Hull F.C., the Hull Kingston Rovers won the match 18–10.

2020
On 15 October 2019, Hull Kingston Rovers turned the end of the season loan deal into a one-year contract.

Honours
 Super League (1): 2017

References

External links

Leeds Rhinos profile
Brisbane Broncos profile
Ipswich Jets profile
SL profile

1992 births
Living people
Australian rugby league players
Brisbane Broncos players
Hull Kingston Rovers players
Ipswich Jets players
Leeds Rhinos players
Manly Warringah Sea Eagles players
Rugby league hookers
Rugby league players from Ipswich, Queensland